Stan Jones (born 1947) is an American writer of mystery novels, and is co-author of a non-fiction oral history book about the Exxon Valdez oil spill.

Jones was born in Anchorage, Alaska, where he lives today. All of his books to date are set in Alaska.

He has written seven books in the Nathan Active mystery series. In order of publication, they are 
 White Sky, Black Ice
 Shaman Pass
 Frozen Sun  
 Village of the Ghost Bears
 Tundra Kill
 The Big Empty (with Patricia Watts)
 Ghost Light (with Patricia Watts)

He is also the co-author (with Sharon Bushell) of The Spill: An Oral History of the Exxon Valdez Disaster.

References

External links
 Stan Jones Official Website
 NY Times review of White Sky, Black Ice

1947 births
Living people
Writers from Anchorage, Alaska
American male novelists
20th-century American novelists
20th-century American male writers